Cannonball Adderley and the Poll-Winners is an album by jazz saxophonist Julian "Cannonball" Adderley released on the Riverside label, featuring performances by Adderley with Wes Montgomery, Ray Brown, Victor Feldman, and Louis Hayes.

Reception
The contemporaneous DownBeat reviewer praised some of the soloing, but added: "This sounds like a gathering of strangers. No one seems at ease – with the tunes or each other". The AllMusic review by Scott Yanow awarded the album 4 stars and states "This was the only meeting on records by Adderley and Montgomery and, although not quite a classic encounter, the music swings hard and is quite enjoyable". The Penguin Guide to Jazz awarded the album 3½ stars stating "The Poll Winners session was a typical all-star meeting of the day, and if it seemed artificial at the time, how good it is to be able to hear, nearly 50 years on, Adderley, Montgomery and Brown in the same band. If there's nothing which could be called surprising, the opportunity to hear these players in their prime is a treat".

Track listing 
 "The Chant" (Victor Feldman) – 6:36
 "Lolita" (Barry Harris) – 8:06
 "Azule Serape" (Feldman) – 6:29
 "Au Privave" (Charlie Parker) – 3:54
 "Yours Is My Heart Alone" (Franz Lehár) – 6:04
 "Never Will I Marry" (Frank Loesser) – 8:32
 "Au Privave" [Alternate Take] – 4:25 Bonus track on CD

Bonus tracks on the 2011 Essential Jazz Classics CD:
"Music in the Air" (Gigi Gryce) - 3:57
"Pretty Strange" (Randy Weston)- 2:53
"The Shouter" (Gildo Mahones)- 5:03
"Social Call" (Gigi Gryce, John Hendricks)- 2:22
"Out of the Past" (Benny Golson) - 4:54

Personnel 
Tracks #1-7:
 Cannonball Adderley – alto saxophone
 Wes Montgomery – guitar
 Victor Feldman – piano, vibes
 Ray Brown – bass
 Louis Hayes – drums
Tracks #8-12:
 Jon Hendricks – vocals
 Wes Montgomery – guitar
 Cannonball Adderley – alto saxophone
 Nat Adderley – cornet
 Gildo Mahones – piano
 Monk Montgomery – electric bass
 Walter Bolden – drums

References 

1961 albums
Riverside Records albums
Cannonball Adderley albums
Albums produced by Orrin Keepnews